The Kalulushi Concentrated Solar Power Station, also Kalulushi CSP Station, is a proposed  concentrated solar power plant in Zambia. The power station is under development by three IPPs, Margam Valley Solar Energy Corporation, Afrisolar Power and EnergyLine Zambia. The power generated here will be integrated into the national grid through Zambia Electricity Supply Corporation Limited (ZESCO).

Location

Overview
The power station is expected to employ new technology in generating electricity. Curved mirrors will concentrate the sun's rays to heat a thermal fluid. The fluids would then turn turbines to generate electricity. It is expected that the output from this power station will be sold to ZESCO for integration into the national grid.

Developers
The table below illustrates the ownership of the special purpose vehicle company, which we will refer to as Kalulushi Solar Power Company, which will own and operate the power station.

Construction
In October 2021, the owner/developers of the renewable energy project awarded the engineering, procurement and construction contract to Sinohydro, the Chinese state-owned hydropower engineering and construction company.

See also

List of power stations in Zambia
ZESCO

References

External links
 Approximate location of Kalulushi CSP Station

Solar power stations in Zambia
Copperbelt Province
Kalulushi District
Energy infrastructure in Zambia